Rop Wiang is a tambon (subdistrict) of Mueang Chiang Rai District, in Chiang Rai Province, Thailand. In 2005, it had a population of 47,992 people. The tambon has seven villages.

References

Tambon of Chiang Rai province
Populated places in Chiang Rai province